Daniele Magliocchetti (born 11 May 1986), is a former Italian football defender.

Football career
He began to play in the youth system of A.S. Roma, and won the 2005 Scudetto Primavera with giallorossi, but he never played an official match with the first team.
 
During the 2006–07 season he played on loan with Serie B team Hellas Verona F.C., while in 2007/08 he went on loan to Cagliari Calcio as part of the agreement that brought Mauro Esposito to AS Roma.

The following season Cagliari paid €516 for his co-ownership.

References

1986 births
Living people
Footballers from Rome
Italian footballers
Italian expatriate footballers
A.S. Roma players
Hellas Verona F.C. players
Cagliari Calcio players
U.S. Triestina Calcio 1918 players
Serie A players
Serie B players
Expatriate footballers in India
Association football midfielders
S.F. Aversa Normanna players